The Zalmoxidae are a family of harvestmen within the suborder Laniatores.

Name
Zalmoxis is the name of a Thracian god.

Description
Zalmoxidae are small Laniatores of dark brown to dark yellow color with varied darker mottling. Some small edaphic species are pale yellowish. Males of varies species bear sexually dimorphic and embellished armature, particularly in the fourth walking leg.

Distribution
Members of this family are distributed in the tropics on opposite sides of the Pacific Ocean, as well as Melanesian archipelagoes and some Micronesian islands. Zalmoxidae do not occur in mainland Africa or Madagascar. In the Neotropics, most species occur from Costa Rica to Brazil, with a center of diversity in Venezuela. In the Indo-Pacific, many species in New Guinea. Two species are found in the Seychelles and Mauritius.

Systematics

For a list of currently described species, see the List of Zalmoxidae species.

Relationships
Zalmoxidae is sister to Fissiphalliidae, with this clade in turn sister to Icaleptidae. The families Kimulidae, Escadabiidae, and Guasiniidae are the other members of the superfamily Zalmoxoidea.

References
 Joel Hallan's Biology Catalog: Zalmoxidae
Kury, A.B., & Pérez González, A. (2007). "Zalmoxidae Sørensen, 1886." In: Pinto-da-Rocha, Machado, Giribet (eds.) Harvestmen - The Biology of Opiliones. Harvard University Press. 
Sharma, P.P. (2012). "New Australasian Zalmoxidae (Opiliones: Laniatores) and a new case of male polymorphism in Opiliones." Zootaxa 3236: 1-35.
Sharma, P.P., Buenavente, P.A.C., Clouse, R.M., Diesmos, A.C., & Giribet, G. (2012). "Forgotten gods: Zalmoxidae of the Philippines and Borneo (Opiliones: Laniatores)." Zootaxa 3280: 29-55.
Sharma, P.P., & Giribet, G. (2012). "Out of the Neotropics: Late Cretaceous colonization of Australasia by American arthropods." Proceedings of the Royal Society B 279: 3501-3509.
Sharma, P.P., Kury, A.B., & Giribet, G. (2011). "Zalmoxidae (Arachnida: Opiliones: Laniatores) of the Paleotropics: a catalogue of Southeast Asian and Indo-Pacific species." Zootaxa 2972: 37-58.

Harvestmen
Arthropods of Central America
Harvestman families